The Charleston Classic is a three-day invitational college basketball season-opening tournament held in Charleston, South Carolina. An ESPN-owned and operated event, it is contested at TD Arena, home of the College of Charleston Cougars.  Each team plays three games in four days, since the second edition the tournament has been played on a Thursday, Friday and Sunday format with a Saturday off day.  The inaugural tournament was held November 14–16, 2008.

Tournament history

Tournament champions

Most Appearances

Brackets 
* – Denotes overtime period

2022 
The 2022 tournament took place at TD Arena in Charleston, South Carolina from November 17 - 20, 2022.

2021

2019

2018

2017

2016

2015

2014

2013

2012

2011 

''Note:'' The 2011 tournament was the first Charleston Classic without the host Southern Conference (SoCon) sending a representative.

2010

2009

2008

References

External links
charlestonclassic.com

College men's basketball competitions in the United States
College basketball competitions
Sports in Charleston, South Carolina
2008 establishments in South Carolina
Recurring sporting events established in 2008
Sports competitions in South Carolina
Events in Charleston, South Carolina